Gabriel Eric Rogers (born 14 February 2001) is an English professional footballer who plays as a midfielder South West Peninsula League Premier Division West club Bude Town.

Career

Early life and youth career
Born in Torquay, Devon, the son of former Plymouth Argyle footballer Andy Rogers. He began his football career spending four years in the youth system of Torquay United until the Devon outfit were forced to fold their youth system. Rogers then moved to the academy of Devon rivals Exeter City where he earned a call-up to train with the England U15 side.

Yeovil Town
Having joined Yeovil Town's academy from Exeter in the summer of 2016 at under-15 level, Rogers signed a youth scholarship deal with the Glovers in June 2017. As a second-year scholar Rogers featured in a number of Yeovil's 2018–19 first team friendlies, including scoring in their 3–0 victory over Gillingham Town, and along with Tyrique Spencer-Clarke he was awarded a first team squad number for the new season. On 14 August 2018, Rogers made his debut for Yeovil in an EFL Cup first round match against Aston Villa, coming on in the 85th minute for Alex Fisher. Doing so made him the first player born in the 2000s to play for the Yeovil senior team. Rogers made his English Football League debut for Yeovil as a late substitute in their 6–0 victory over Newport County, on 15 September 2018. In December 2018, Rogers was awarded his first professional contract with Yeovil committing him to the club until June 2021.

In September 2019, Rogers joined Southern League Premier Division South side Salisbury on a youth loan deal. On 28 September 2019, Rogers made his debut for Salisbury as a second half substitute in a 2–0 victory over Hartley Wintney. During his one month loan in Wiltshire, Rogers appeared four times for Salisbury scoring twice in a 5–1 against Amesbury Town in the Wiltshire Premier Shield.

On 7 November 2020, Rogers scored his first professional goal for Yeovil with a stoppage time winner in extra time, in a 1–0 FA Cup first round victory against Bromley.

At the end of the 2020–21 season, Rogers was released by Yeovil Town having not played since 29 November 2020.

Torquay United
On 10 August 2021, Rogers rejoined National League side Torquay United following a successful trial. On 10 December 2021, Rogers joined Southern League Premier Division South side Truro City on a one-month loan deal.

In February 20222, Rogers went out on loan again this time to Southern League Division One South side Plymouth Parkway.

Bude Town
After requesting his contract with Kidderminster Harriers be terminated to move back to Devon, Rogers signed for South West Peninsula League Premier Division West side Bude Town.

Career statistics

Honours
Plymouth Parkway
Southern Football League Division One South: 2021–22

References

External links
Gabriel Rogers profile at the Yeovil Town F.C. website

2001 births
Living people
Sportspeople from Torquay
People educated at Churston Ferrers Grammar School
English footballers
Association football midfielders
Torquay United F.C. players
Exeter City F.C. players
Yeovil Town F.C. players
Salisbury F.C. players
Truro City F.C. players
Plymouth Parkway F.C. players
Kidderminster Harriers F.C. players
English Football League players
National League (English football) players
Southern Football League players